The 1968 Tour de Suisse was the 32nd edition of the Tour de Suisse cycle race and was held from 14 June to 22 June 1968. The race started and finished in Zürich. The race was won by Louis Pfenninger of the  team.

General classification

References

1968
Tour de Suisse